Orofino ("fine gold" [ore] in Spanish) is a city in and the county seat of Clearwater County, Idaho, along Orofino Creek and the north bank of the Clearwater River. It is the major city within the Nez Perce Indian Reservation. The population was 3,142 at the time of the 2010 census.

Nearby is the historical "Canoe Camp," where the Lewis and Clark expedition built five new dugout canoes and embarked on October 7, 1805, downstream to the Pacific Ocean. Nearby is the Dworshak National Fish Hatchery, started to try to compensate for the loss of migratory fish upstream after the dam was constructed.

When the United States government opened up the Nez Percé reservation to non-tribal settlers in 1895, thousands of European Americans rushed to lay claims to land. Clifford Fuller set up a trading post on his new homestead. The town (Orofino-on-the-Clearwater) was established the next year. The railroad, later part of the Camas Prairie Railroad, was constructed from Lewiston in 1899.

Orofino is home to state institutions: Idaho State Hospital North and the Idaho Correctional Institution–Orofino. These two facilities are located adjacent to Orofino High School, which includes the junior high or middle school grades, and whose mascot is the maniac.

Orofino hosts an annual July 4 celebration, as well as the Clearwater County Fair and Lumberjack Days in late summer. Each spring, Boomershoot, an annual precision rifle event, is held nearby.

Geography
Orofino is located at  (46.485485, -116.258847).

Climate
The city has a climate typical of low-elevation areas in Idaho and eastern Washington. Orofino has a dry-summer continental climate (Köppen Dsb). Due to the warm summers, it nearly qualifies as a continental Mediterranean climate (Dsa).

Demographics

2010 census
As of the census of 2010, there were 3,142 people, 1,167 households, and 698 families residing in the city. The racial makeup of the city was 91.7% White, 0.5% African American, 2.5% Native American, 1.4% Asian, 0.3% Pacific Islander, 1.2% from other races, and 2.4% from two or more races. Hispanic or Latino of any race were 4.3% of the population.

There were 1,167 households, of which 24.3% had children under the age of 18 living with them, 46.4% were married couples living together, 9.3% had a female householder with no husband present, 4.2% had a male householder with no wife present, and 40.2% were non-families. 34.8% of all households were made up of individuals, and 17.5% had someone living alone who was 65 years of age or older. The average household size was 2.17 and the average family size was 2.77.

The median age in the city was 43.7 years. 17% of residents were under the age of 18; 7.2% were between the ages of 18 and 24; 27.3% were from 25 to 44; 28.3% were from 45 to 64; and 20.1% were 65 years of age or older. The gender makeup of the city was 58.3% male and 41.7% female.

2000 census
As of the census of 2000, there were 3,247 people, 1,137 households, and 767 families residing in the city. The racial makeup of the city was 93.93% White, 0.37% African American, 2.13% Native American, 0.59% Asian, 0.09% Pacific Islander, 0.99% from other races, and 1.91% from two or more races. Hispanic or Latino of any race were 2.25% of the population.

There were 1,137 households, out of which 28.9% had children under the age of 18 living with them, 54.1% were married couples living together, 8.4% had a female householder with no husband present, and 32.5% were non-families. 27.6% of all households were made up of individuals, and 12.8% had someone living alone who was 65 years of age or older. The average household size was 2.33 and the average family size was 2.83.

In the city, the population was spread out, with 20.1% under the age of 18, 7.9% from 18 to 24, 30.4% from 25 to 44, 26.1% from 45 to 64, and 15.6% who were 65 years of age or older. The median age was 40 years. For every 100 females, there were 132.9 males. For every 100 females age 18 and over, there were 143.2 males.

The median income for a household in the city was $30,580, and the median income for a family was $36,908. Males had a median income of $30,386 versus $20,968 for females. The per capita income for the city was $14,563. About 7.6% of families and 12.1% of the population were below the poverty line, including 16.3% of those under age 18 and 7.1% of those age 65 or over.

Government and infrastructure
The city government is small due to the limited number of residents.

Major facilities are run by the state, which operates the Idaho State Hospital North here. In addition, the Idaho Department of Correction operates the Idaho Correctional Institution-Orofino here.

The United States Postal Service operates the Orofino Post Office.

Transportation
The city is served by US 12, a two-lane undivided highway on the south bank of the Clearwater River, connected to Orofino by a bridge. The highway connects to Lewiston to the west and Missoula, Montana (over Lolo Pass) to the east. The route is known as the "Northwest Passage Scenic Byway," a National Scenic Byway. The population is dependent on cars. Most areas have few or no sidewalks.

References

External links
 Orofino, Idaho
 Orofino Chamber of Commerce
 Orofino High School

Cities in Clearwater County, Idaho
Cities in Idaho
County seats in Idaho
Populated places established in 1895
1895 establishments in Idaho